Culver is a city in Ottawa County, Kansas, United States.  As of the 2020 census, the population of the city was 114.  It is located northwest of Salina at the intersection of 90th Road and Aspen Road, next to an abandoned railroad.

History
Culver was laid out in about 1878. It was named after George Washington Culver who was living in Ottawa County, Kansas in August 1868 when he was recruited to be a scout for Col. George Forsyth, following the first Spillman-Bacon Creek Indian raid. At daybreak on September 17, 1868 Forsyth's band of 50 civilian scouts was attacked by about 1,000 of Roman Nose's dog soldier warriors in northeastern Colorado Territory. This was known as Beecher Island. They took cover on a small sandy island in the middle of the Arickaree fork of the Republican river about 17 miles south of present-day Wray, Colorado. The next three days were spent fighting and by the time the fighting ended, the scouts were out of rations and living on horse and mule meat. About half of the scouts were wounded at the outbreak of the fighting. Culver was one of five scouts killed or mortally wounded.  Culver was buried at the battleground, later moved to Fort Wallace Cemetery and eventually to Fort Leavenworth National Cemetery. Before Beecher Island, during the Civil war he served as 2nd Lt, Co E, Second Colorado Cavalry. Following the Civil War, he worked for a time as a watchmaker in Junction City, Kansas, and shortly before his death was elected to public office in Ottawa County, Kansas. The town and township of Culver were named in honor of him.

A post office was opened at Culver in 1873 and remained in operation until it was discontinued in 1984.,

Geography
Culver is located at  (38.969581, -97.759657).

Demographics

Culver is part of the Salina Micropolitan Statistical Area.

2010 census
As of the census of 2010, there were 121 people, 48 households, and 34 families residing in the city. The racial makeup of the city was 92.6% White, 4.1% African American, 0.8% Native American, 0.8% Asian, 0.8% from other races, and 0.8% from two or more races. Hispanic or Latino of any race were 3.3% of the population.

There were 48 households, of which 22.9% had children under the age of 18 living with them, 56.3% were married couples living together, 10.4% had a female householder with no husband present, 4.2% had a male householder with no wife present, and 29.2% were non-families. 25.0% of all households were made up of individuals, and 8.4% had someone living alone who was 65 years of age or older. The average household size was 2.52 and the average family size was 2.91.

The median age in the city was 47.3 years. 17.4% of residents were under the age of 18; 11.5% were between the ages of 18 and 24; 18.2% were from 25 to 44; 37.1% were from 45 to 64; and 15.7% were 65 years of age or older. The gender makeup of the city was 52.9% male and 47.1% female.

2000 census
As of the census of 2000, there were 164 people, 57 households, and 47 families residing in the city. The racial makeup of the city was 91.46% White, 5.49% Native American, and 3.05% from two or more races. Hispanic or Latino of any race were 3.66% of the population.

There were 57 households, out of which 45.6% had children under the age of 18 living with them, 66.7% were married couples living together, 8.8% had a female householder with no husband present, and 15.8% were non-families. 15.8% of all households were made up of individuals, and 7.0% had someone living alone who was 65 years of age or older. The average household size was 2.88 and the average family size was 3.06.

In the city, the population was spread out, with 30.5% under the age of 18, 6.1% from 18 to 24, 24.4% from 25 to 44, 28.0% from 45 to 64, and 11.0% who were 65 years of age or older. The median age was 37 years. For every 100 females, there were 118.7 males. For every 100 females age 18 and over, there were 103.6 males.

The median income for a household in the city was $39,792, and the median income for a family was $41,563. Males had a median income of $25,000 versus $20,417 for females. The per capita income for the city was $13,047. About 9.8% of families and 14.4% of the population were below the poverty line, including 21.3% of those under the age of eighteen and 19.0% of those 65 or over.

Education
The community is served by Twin Valley USD 240 public school district.

Notable people
 George Washington Carver, lived in the vicinity for a brief period.

References

Further reading

External links
 City of Culver
 Culver - Directory of Public Officials
 Culver city map, KDOT

Cities in Kansas
Cities in Ottawa County, Kansas
Salina, Kansas micropolitan area